Argüelles is a station on Line 3, Line 4, and Line 6 of the Madrid Metro in Madrid, Spain. It is located underneath the intersection of Princesa and Marqués de Urquijo streets, between the districts of Moncloa-Aravaca and Chamberí, in fare Zone A. The station is named after the neighborhood of Argüelles, which is in turn named after the 19th century Spanish politician Agustín Argüelles.

History 
The station was inaugurated on 15 July 1941 when Line 3 was extended from Sol to Argüelles. The platforms were built underneath Princesa street between the intersections with Marqués de Urquijo/Alberto Aguilera and Altamirano streets.

The Line 4 platforms were inaugurated on 23 March 1944 when Line 4 first opened. The platforms were built under Alberto Aguilera street between the intersections with Gaztambide and Andrés Mellado streets. Argüelles is a terminus station, and the platforms were built at the same level as the Line 3 platforms, which prevents the line from being extended westward.

The Line 6 platforms were inaugurated on 10 May 1995 when the segment between Laguna and Ciudad Universitaria was opened, converting Line 6 into a circular route. They are deeper than the other platforms, and are located between Marqués de Urquijo and Buen Suceso streets.

References 

Line 3 (Madrid Metro) stations
Line 4 (Madrid Metro) stations
Line 6 (Madrid Metro) stations
Railway stations in Spain opened in 1941